In 1970 California became one of the first states in the U.S. to implement an act that conserves and protects endangered species and their environments. The California Endangered Species Act (CESA) declares that "all native species of fishes, amphibians, reptiles, birds, mammals, and plants, and their habitats, threatened with extinction and those experiencing a significant decline which, if not halted, would lead to a threatened or endangered designation, will be protected or preserved."

In California the Department of Fish and Wildlife oversees CESA and makes sure that citizens are following laws/regulations that are in place. They also have a huge impact on what species are added to CESA as they survey species populations in the wild. The Department of Fish and Wildlife issues citation to violators, fines of up to $50,000 and/or one year imprisonment for crimes involving endangered species, and fines of up to $25,000 and/or six months imprisonment for crimes involving threatened species.

History
In 1970, California was one of the first states to officially create statutory schemes for protecting endangered wildlife and environments. This was completed earlier than the Federal Government’s Endangered Species Act; ESA, which was mandated in 1973. However, according to the chronologies listed by the Department of Fish and Wildlife, California began preservation and protection statutes in 1909 when non-game birds were first protected. In 1957, rules were devised to prevent the “taking” of animals or plants under protection. The term “to take” is basically defined as removing, harming, or killing the protected species.  However, the California Endangered Species Act (CESA) explicitly defines 'take' as not including the terms 'harm' or harass', while these terms do appear in the federal ESA definition of 'take'.  This has been interpreted to mean that in California, 'take' of a listed species must involve mortality, as opposed to habitat alteration that adversely impacts the listed species.

The year 1970 brought about two major California enactments: the California Species Preservation Act, and the California Endangered Species Act. The Species Preservation Act tasked the Department with creating an inventory of all fish and wildlife that could be considered rare or endangered. The list was to be reported to the Legislature along with suggestions on methods for protection. The California Endangered Species Act put into effect the Department’s authority to determine the designation under which wildlife was labeled as “rare” or “endangered” and provided restrictions on the importing and moving of those species except by permit. At the time, this Act did not include plants or invertebrates.

In 1984, CESA was amended and became a more complex Act that determined it the state’s responsibility to preserve and protect endangered species. The amendment to CESA now included plant and invertebrate species and also announced the intention to purchase lands for preservation of protected species. Mitigation and enhancement methods were also introduced. In 1997, CESA was amended again to allow the “incidental taking” of protected species beyond the original ruling of scientific and educational purposes only. This has been cause for some controversy.

CESA process overview

While CESA is considered effective, the multitude of agencies working within the framework of CESA can lead to poor communication and effectiveness due to entities working at cross purposes, which ultimately leads to less protection and poorer use of time and resources for conservation programming.

Listing

The listing process includes procedures for individuals, organizations or the California Department of Fish and Wildlife. Petitions can be submitted to the Department for a species, subspecies, or variety of any plant or animal to add, delete, or note a change in status on the list of endangered or threatened species. The petitions will be handled by the Habitat Conservation Planning Branch. The process includes reviewing a region where the species is in habitation, conducting a visit to where the species is, and presenting a report. After 90 days of the petition, the Habitat Conservation Planning Branch sends the report to the director for approval. If the petition is approved the species becomes a candidate species.

As of March, 2015, CESA lists 49 animals as Endangered and another 37 as Threatened. An additional 4 species are candidates for listing as either threatened or endangered. No species are proposed for delisting. As of April, 2015 CESA lists 132 land plant species as Endangered, 22 as Threatened, and 64 as Rare. No species are currently candidates for listing.

Comparison to similar laws

California's endangered species act is considered superior to similar acts enacted in other states due to its comprehensive design, its involvement in the pursuit of prevention, and for its cooperative relationships with programs such as Natural Community Conservation Planning (NCCP).

Litigation

In 2018, public interest groups petitioned to list four species of bumblebee as endangered in California, and this was initially approved; however, in 2019 this decision was challenged by a petition filed in trial court, and the trial court granted the petition, agreeing with the plaintiffs that the law did not grant authority to list insects as endangered. This decision was then appealed, and the California Court of Appeal in May of 2022 upheld that bumblebees (and all other invertebrates) are protected under the CESA, because (1) the statute has since 1984 explicitly listed invertebrates under the law's definition of fish ("a wild fish, mollusk, crustacean, invertebrate, amphibian, or part, spawn, or ovum of any of those animals"), and the legal definition overrides any other definition, even for a common colloquial term like "fish", and (2) the Act originally included one terrestrial invertebrate, and therefore it was demonstrably intentional that terrestrial invertebrates (including bees) are meant to be granted protection; the trial court's decision was therefore summarily reversed. In September of 2022, California’s Supreme Court denied review of a further petition filed to appeal the Court of Appeal's May decision; the Supreme Court’s decision not to review the petition for appeal allows the Court of Appeal’s earlier ruling to stand.

References

1970 in California
1970 in the environment
1970 in law
California law
Endangered biota of the United States
Environment of California
Environmental law in the United States